Cass Township is one of twelve townships in Pulaski County, Indiana, United States. As of the 2010 census, its population was 878 and it contained 376 housing units.

Cass Township was organized in 1850.

Geography

Unincorporated towns
 Clarks at 
 Radioville at 
(This list is based on USGS data and may include former settlements.)

Adjacent townships
 Railroad Township, Starke County (north)
 Wayne Township, Starke County (northeast)
 Rich Grove Township (east)
 Jefferson Township (southeast)
 White Post Township (south)
 Gillam Township, Jasper County (southwest)
 Walker Township, Jasper County (west)
 Kankakee Township, Jasper County (northwest)

Cemeteries
The township contains Bethlehem Cemetery, Noggle Cemetery, St. John's Cemetery, and Sutton Cemetery.

Major highways
  U.S. Route 421

Education
 North Judson-San Pierre School Corporation
 West Central School Corporation

Cass Township residents may obtain a free library card from the Pulaski County Public Library in Winamac.

Political districts
 Indiana's 2nd congressional district
 State House District 20
 State Senate District 5

References
 United States Census Bureau 2008 TIGER/Line Shapefiles
 United States Board on Geographic Names (GNIS)
 IndianaMap

External links
 Indiana Township Association
 United Township Association of Indiana

Townships in Pulaski County, Indiana
Townships in Indiana